Babine River is a river in central British Columbia, Canada.

Babine River is considered one of the last unspoiled and pristine rivers in British Columbia.  Through most of its course it is enclosed by the Babine River Corridor Provincial Park which abounds in black bears and grizzly bears.  It is famous in fishing circles as the home of some of the largest rainbow trout and steelhead in the world.  Babine River is a famous whitewater run for kayakers, canoeists and rafters.

References
Atlas of Canada (atlas.gc.ca) search results for Babine River
PPS Destinations Report, Babine River, October 2005

Rivers of British Columbia
Skeena Country
Bulkley Valley
Babine